Rodger Penzabene (1945 – December 31, 1967) was an American songwriter for the Motown label. Among his most notable compositions as a lyricist are "Take Me in Your Arms and Love Me" by Gladys Knight & the Pips; "The End of Our Road" by Gladys Knight & the Pips and Marvin Gaye;  and a trilogy of hits for The Temptations: "You're My Everything", "I Wish It Would Rain", and "I Could Never Love Another (After Loving You)".

Penzabene was of Sicilian and Irish descent. He attended Mumford High School in Detroit, Michigan.  He was a childhood friend and neighbor of Cornelius Grant, with whom he wrote "You're My Everything".  After Grant became musical director for the Temptations, Penzabene continued to contribute songs for the group, and for other Motown acts.

The mournful songs "I Wish It Would Rain" and "I Could Never Love Another" reportedly drew from Penzabene's real-life pain and suffering. Otis Williams wrote that: "We liked Roger a lot.  He was young, nice-looking, but kind of quiet and reserved, and very humble.  The inspiration for these great songs was his unhappy personal life."

On New Year's Eve 1967, a week after the release of "I Wish It Would Rain", Penzabene committed suicide by gunshot at the age of 22.

References

1945 births
1967 suicides
Songwriters from Michigan
Motown artists
American people of Italian descent
American people of Irish descent
Suicides by firearm in Michigan
20th-century American composers
Mumford High School alumni